Vincenzo Patrick Guglielmelli (born 15 June 1987 in Massafra, Province of Taranto) is an Italian footballer. He plays as a forward. He is currently playing for S.F. Aversa Normanna.

See also
Football in Italy
List of football clubs in Italy

References

External links
 Career profile by tuttocalciatori.net

1987 births
Living people
People from Massafra
Italian footballers
U.S. Viterbese 1908 players
Association football forwards
S.F. Aversa Normanna players
Footballers from Apulia
Sportspeople from the Province of Taranto